Lady Shao ( 4th century) was the wife of Liu Xia, a military general during the Jin dynasty (266–420). She was one of the few recorded women from her period to have fought in battle, commanding a small group of soldiers to save her husband from encirclement. After her husband’s death, she helped in quelling a mutiny by his former soldiers.

Life 
Very little is recorded about Lady Shao, but she was deemed worthy enough to receive an entry within her husband's biography in the Book of Jin. Records also only refer to her as "[Liu] Xia's wife" (遐妻), contrary to how traditional historians would bestow the name 'shi' (氏) after a woman's surname if her given name is not known (i.e., Shaoshi (邵氏)). Lady Shao was from Anyang County, Wei Commandery, and she was the daughter of the Jin official, Shao Xu. She was described as having inherited her father's bravery and resolve.

Early in the 4th century, northern China was in the midst of being conquered by the Xiongnu Han Zhao dynasty. In 314, Shao Xu took up arms against Han in Yanci (厭次, around present-day Dezhou, Shandong) and became one of the Jin dynasty's northern vassals, acting as their Inspector of Jizhou. Meanwhile, a refugee leader named Liu Xia was operating between the Ji River and Yellow River, also at odds with Han. Liu Xia was famed for his strength and was from the same province as the Shaos. Shao Xu respected Liu Xia, so he wedded him to Lady Shao.

Lady Shao evidently followed Liu Xia throughout their marriage. In 319, the Han general, Shi Le, proclaimed independence from his state and formed the Later Zhao. Liu Xia traded blows with Zhao between 319 and 324. In one of his battles, Liu Xia was greatly surrounded by the Zhao general, Shi Hu. Lady Shao quickly formed a small group of cavalry and led them to save her husband. Despite being outnumbered, Lady Shao was able to fight her way to Liu Xia and bring him to safety.

Eventually, however, Liu Xia was forced to relocate further south due to Later Zhao's growing power. In 320, Zhao captured Shao Xu, and just a year later, Lady Shao's family surrendered their territory and themselves to Zhao. In 324, Liu Xia camped in Sikou (泗口, located at Xuzhou, Jiangsu), where he continued serving Jin before dying in 326. Lady Shao had at least one son with Liu Xia, who they named Liu Zhao (劉肇).

Liu Zhao was Liu Xia's heir, but at the time of Xia's death, Zhao was too young to assume his father's responsibilities. For this reason, the Jin court appointed the general, Guo Mo to take command of Xia's army. Liu Xia's generals, including his brother-in-law, Tian Fang (田防), were not happy to serve under someone else. Therefore, they proclaimed Liu Zhao as their leader and rebelled. Lady Shao tried to stop the revolt by advising the generals against their decision, but she was dismissed.

The Jin court sent the general, Liu Jiao (劉矯), to defeat the rebels in response to the rebellion. Meanwhile, Lady Shao undermined the revolt by secretly setting fire to the armoury, depriving the rebels of their weapons and armor. Because of this, when Liu Jiao arrived, the rebels were ill-equipped and easily defeated. The rebels and their leaders were beheaded, while Liu Zhao was spared and conferred his father's title. Lady Shao, along with her children, mother-in-law, and Liu Xia's subordinates, was moved to the Jin capital, Jiankang, where she likely spent the remainder of her life.

References 

 Fang, Xuanling (ed.) (648). Book of Jin (Jin Shu).
 Sima, Guang (1084). Zizhi Tongjian.

4th-century Chinese women
Women in 4th-century warfare
Women in ancient Chinese warfare
Jin dynasty (266–420) generals